Steppin' Out or Stepping Out may refer to:

Film and theatre 
 Stepping Out (1919 film), an American silent drama film directed by Fred Niblo
 Steppin' Out (1925 film), an American silent comedy film directed by Frank R. Strayer
 Stepping Out (1931 film), an American farce directed by Charles Reisner
 Stepping Out, a 1980 Australian documentary film by Chris Noonan
 Stepping Out (1991 film), an American musical comedy adaptation of Richard Harris's play (see next)
 Stepping Out (play), a 1984 play by Richard Harris

Music

Albums 
 Steppin' Out (Herb Alpert album), 2013
 Steppin' Out (Joan Armatrading album), 1979 live album
 Steppin' Out (Tony Bennett album), 1993
 Steppin' Out (Eric Clapton album), 1981 compilation
 Steppin' Out (Cleopatra album), 2000
 Stepping Out (Red Garland album), 1981
 Steppin' Out (High Inergy album)' 1978
 Steppin' Out (George Howard album) or the title song, 1984
 Stepping Out (Diana Krall album), 1993
 Stepping Out (Steve Laury album) or the title song, 1990
 Steppin' Out (Jack McDuff album), 1969
 Steppin' Out (Neil Sedaka album) or the title song, 1976
 Steppin' Out!, by Harold Vick, or the title song, 1963
 Steppin' Out with the Grateful Dead: England '72, 2002
 Stepping Out: The Very Best of Joe Jackson, 1990 compilation
 Steppin' Out - The Collection, by Joe Jackson, 2013
 Steppin' Out, by Daryl Stuermer, 1988
 Steppin' Out, by Gary Stewart, 1976
 Steppin' Out, by Mike Fahn, 1989
 Steppin' Out, by the Osmonds, 1979

Songs
 "Steppin' Out" (instrumental), by Memphis Slim, 1959; covered by Eric Clapton
 "Steppin' Out" (Joe Jackson song), 1982
 "Steppin' Out" (Kool & the Gang song), 1981
 "Steppin' Out (Gonna Boogie Tonight)", by Tony Orlando and Dawn, 1974
 "Stepping Out", by Bucks Fizz, B-side of the single "If You Can't Stand the Heat", 1982
 "Stepping Out", by the Dictators from Manifest Destiny, 1977
 "Steppin' Out", by Electric Light Orchestra from Out of the Blue, 1977
 "Steppin' (Out)", by the Gap Band from The Gap Band II, 1979
 "Steppin' Out", by Joan Armatrading from Back to the Night, 1975
 "Steppin' Out", by Kaskade from In the Moment, 2004
 "Stepping Out", by Kevin Ayers from As Close as You Think, 1986
 "Steppin' Out", by Paul Revere & the Raiders from Just Like Us!, 1966

Television

Series 
 Stepping Out (British TV series), a 2013 competitive dancing show
 Stepping Out (German TV series), a 2015 competitive dancing show
 Stepping Out (Singaporean TV series), a 1999 Mandarin-language drama

Episodes 
 "Steppin' Out", 1977 episode of Laverne & Shirley (season 2)
 "Steppin' Out", 1999 episode of Little Men
 "Steppin' Out", 1985 episode of The New Leave It to Beaver
 "Steppin' Out", 2001 episode of Yu-Gi-Oh! Duel Monsters (season 2)

Other media 
 Steppin' Out (magazine), an American entertainment industry magazine

See also 
 "I'm Stepping Out", a song by John Lennon
 "Steppin' Out with My Baby", a 1948 song written by Irving Berlin, also covered by Tony Bennett